Cratera aureomaculata is a species of land planarian from Brazil.

Description 
Cratera aureomaculata is a medium-sized land planarian with an elongate body with parallel margins and slightly convex dorsal surface. The dorsum has a yellow background that is covered by brown pigmentation in the anterior region. There are blackish pigmentation forming irregular flecks over the dorsal surface, being larger laterally and becoming more concentrates towards the posterior tip. The venter is light grey with yellowish margins, becoming brownish with darker margins in the anterior region.

The several eyes of C. aureomaculata are distributed marginally in the first millimeters of the body and posteriorly become dorsal, occupying about one third of the body width on each side and becoming less numerous towards the anterior tip.

Etymology 
The specific epithet aureomaculata comes from Latin aureus, golden + maculata, spotted, flecked, thus meaning "golden flecked" and refers to the yellowish background color covered by irregular black flecks.

Distribution 
Cratera aureomaculata is known only from the Três Barras National Forest, Santa Catarina, Brazil.

References 

Geoplanidae
Invertebrates of Brazil